Van der Knaap is a surname. Notable people with the surname include:

Cees van der Knaap (born 1951), Dutch politician
David van der Knaap (born 1948), South African cricketer
Marjo van der Knaap (born 1958), Dutch neurologist
Richard van der Knaap (born 1947), South African cricketer

Dutch-language surnames
Afrikaans-language surnames
Surnames of Dutch origin